November Group may refer to:

 November Group (German), a 1918 German political group of artists
 November Group (Finland), a Finnish group of Expressionist artists
 November Group (band), a Boston-based music group